Dmitri Vyacheslavovich Chugunov (born 9 June 1968) is a former Russian professional footballer.

Club career
He made his professional debut in the Soviet Top League in 1986 for FC Torpedo Moscow.

From 1992 to 2005 he was a professional futsal player.

Honours
 Soviet Top League bronze: 1988.
 Soviet Cup finalist: 1988.

European club competitions
With FC Torpedo Moscow.

 UEFA Cup Winners' Cup 1986–87: 2 games.
 UEFA Cup Winners' Cup 1989–90: 3 games, 1 goal.

References

1968 births
Footballers from Moscow
Living people
Soviet footballers
Russian footballers
Association football defenders
Soviet Union under-21 international footballers
Soviet Top League players
FC Torpedo Moscow players
FC Lokomotiv Moscow players
FC Shinnik Yaroslavl players
Sepsi-78 players
Russian expatriate footballers
Expatriate footballers in Finland
Russian men's futsal players